Lucky Lekgwathi (born 1 August 1976 in Ga-Rankuwa, Gauteng) is a retired South African football defender who played and captained Orlando Pirates. He played for South Africa at the 2005 CONCACAF Gold Cup, at which South Africa were guests.

He is arguably Orlando Pirates' most successful captain, having captained them to six major trophies in 2 seasons (2010/10 & 2011/12) making Pirates the only Double Treble Champions since the formation of the PSL. He was very instrumental in ending Orlando Pirates' 8-year league drought, scoring crucial goals in the process, most notably a winner against Supersport United.

Many people call him 'Captain my Captain', possibly in reference to Walt Whitmans poem, O Captain! My Captain! the club skipper had a hugely impressive 2010/11 and 2011/12 season, as he played a significant role in helping Orlando Pirates dominate South African Football for two consecutive seasons.
The veteran defender became the clubs' darling and an inspirational leader to the younger players in the squad. He knew how to steer the ship during tough times.
His most notorious contributions which will forever last in the memories of the club's faithful, is the diving header he scored against Lamontville Golden Arrows F.C. in Durban in the last match of the 2011 season as Pirates went on to claim the league title after winning that match.
He was also the goal scorer of an important goal away to SuperSport United still in the 2011 season, a goal that gave the club an important win which eventually led to the team winning the league in Durban.
He was an important figure in Pirates' excellent Campaign in the African Champions League where the team finished as runners up in 2013.
Lucky represented the South African National team 13 times.
His Pirates' debut: Orlando Pirates 5–0 Moroka Swallows (10 August 2002, BP Top 8)

Honours

Club level: 2010/11 League winner, MTN8 winner, Nedbank Cup winner. 2011/12 League winner, MTN8 winner, Telkom Cup winner. 2013 CAF Champions League runners-up. 2013/14 Nedbank Cup winner. 2015 CAF Confederation Cup runners-up.
2008/09 Telkom Charity Cup winner, 2007/08 SAA Supa 8 runner-up. Telkom Charity Cup runner-up, Vodacom Challenge runner-up, 2006/07 Pirates' Most Improved Player of the Season.
2005/06 PSL runner-up, Absa Cup runner-up, Vodacom challenge champion, 2004/05 PSL runner-up, PSL's most perfectly team of the year, 2002/03 PSL champion (all with Pirates), 1999/00 PSL promotion (with Ria Stars)
National level: 13 Bafana Bafana caps, 2002 COSAFA Cup champion.

External links

1976 births
Living people
People from Ga-Rankuwa
South African soccer players
Association football defenders
Orlando Pirates F.C. players
South Africa international soccer players
2005 CONCACAF Gold Cup players
Sportspeople from Gauteng